Alfred Jerger (9 June 1889 – 18 November 1976) was an Austrian operatic bass-baritone, who began his career as a conductor of operettas, and was also an interim director of the Vienna State Opera  and a professor of the Vienna Music Academy. He appeared at the Salzburg Festival from 1922 to 1959, and created the leading role of Mandryka in Arabella by Richard Strauss, among others.

Life and career 
Born Alois Wendelin in Brno, he is said to have studied at the University of Music and Performing Arts Vienna. He became operetta-Kapellmeister at the Stadttheater Passau in the 1912/13 season. The next season saw him in Winterthur and Zurich in 1915, where he served as répétiteur. A year later he also appeared as an actor, and from the 1915/16 season only as actor and singer. In 1917, he appeared as Lothario in Mignon by Ambroise Thomas. He appeared in the world premiere of Busoni's Turandot the same year.

In 1919 he became a member of the Bavarian State Opera through the mediation of Richard Strauss. In 1921, he moved on to the Vienna State Opera, where he worked until 1953, performing 150 roles. He also dealt with new arrangement of librettos. Among others, he wrote new versions for Die Fledermaus by Johann Strauss and Donizeti's Don Pasquale for performances at the house. Jerger created the role of the Man in Schönberg's Die glückliche Hand at the Theater an der Wien in 1924. On 1 July 1933, he appeared in the leading role of Mandryka in the premiere of Arabella by Richard Strauss at the Semperoper in Dresden. Jerger performed opposite Viorica Ursuleac in the title role, with Clemens Krauss conducting.

From 1922 to 1959, Jerger often took part in the Salzburg Festival, where he made his debut in the title role of Mozart's Don Giovanni, with Richard Strauss as the conductor. He also appeared as Sixtus Beckmesser in Wagner's Die Meistersinger von Nürnberg, conducted by Wilhelm Furtwängler in 1938. He coached younger singers for their roles, such as George London for Don Giovanni and Eugene Onegin. In the film Unsterbliche Melodien (1936) he was seen in the leading role of the waltz king Johann Strauss. In 1945, the ensemble of the Vienna State Opera made him the provisional artistic director. In 1947 he was appointed professor at the Vienna Music Academy. Among his students was Leonie Rysanek.

Jerger undertook numerous tours and left behind many recordings. In 1969, at the age of 80, he took part in a recording of Der Rosenkavalier in the role of the notary.

Jerger died in Vienna on 18 November 1976 at age 87. His grave is located at the Vienna Central Cemetery (group 40, number 46).

Awards 
Jerger was awarded the title Kammersänger in 1934, and received the Cross (Ritterkreuz I. Klasse) of the Austrian Decoration for Science and Art the same year. He became a knight of the Legion of Honour before 1936.

Sound samples 
 Die Zauberflöte – Toscanini – Salzburg 1937 – 1. Act
 Die Zauberflöte – Toscanini – Salzburg 1937 – 2. Act with Alexander Kipnis (Sarastro), Julia Osváth (Queen of the night), Jarmila Novotná (Pamina), Helge Rosvaenge (Tamino), Willi Domgraf-Fassbaender (Papageno), Dora Komarek (Papagena), Alfred Jerger (narrator), William Wernigk (Monostatos) – live 30 July 1937 Salzburg Festival

See also 
 Salzburg Festival: history and repertoire, 1922–1926

References

Further reading 

 Karl-Josef Kutsch, Leo Riemens: Großes Sängerlexikon. Original edition. K. G. Saur, Bern, 1993, first volume A–L, 
 
 Barbara Boisits: Jerger, Alfred. In Oesterreichisches Musiklexikon. Inline-edition, Vienna 2002, ; Printed edition: Volume 2, Verlag der Österreichischen Akademie der Wissenschaften (Publishing House of the Austrian Academy of Sciences), Vienna 2003, .

External links 

 
 
 
 

1889 births
1976 deaths
Musicians from Brno
20th-century Austrian male opera singers
Austrian basses
Austrian male film actors
Austrian male stage actors
Australian opera directors
University of Music and Performing Arts Vienna alumni
Austro-Hungarian musicians
Chevaliers of the Ordre des Arts et des Lettres
Burials at the Vienna Central Cemetery
20th-century Austrian male actors
Vienna State Opera